Euryparasitus calcarator is a species of mite in the family Ologamasidae.

References

Ologamasidae
Articles created by Qbugbot
Animals described in 1910